Dartmouth Cancer Center (DCC) is a comprehensive cancer center as designated by the National Cancer Institute, with administrative offices located within the Dartmouth-Hitchcock Medical Center in Lebanon, New Hampshire.

DCC combines advanced cancer research at Dartmouth College and the Geisel School of Medicine in Hanover, New Hampshire, with patient-centered cancer care provided at Dartmouth-Hitchcock Medical Center, Dartmouth-Hitchcock regional locations in Manchester and Keene, New Hampshire, and St. Johnsbury, Vermont, and 11 partner hospitals throughout New Hampshire and Vermont.

History 

Dartmouth Cancer Center (DCC) was founded in 1972 as the Norris Cotton Cancer Center. It was designated as a Clinical Cancer Center by the National Cancer Institute in 1978 and as a Comprehensive Cancer Center in 1980. As of 2021, DCC was one of 51 NCI-Designated Comprehensive Cancer Centers in the United States, and one of three in New England.

DCC was originally named after Norris Cotton, who served New Hampshire in the U.S. House of Representatives from 1947 to 1954 and in the U.S. Senate from 1954 to 1975 and secured federal funding through the National Cancer Act of 1971, which led to the Cancer Center's establishment. Norris Cotton Cancer Center was renamed Dartmouth Cancer Center in 2022 after a multi-million dollar rebranding effort by its parent institution, Dartmouth-Hitchcock Health, which itself was renamed "Dartmouth Health."

Mission 

The mission of Dartmouth Cancer Center (DCC) is to understand the causes of cancer, to translate new knowledge into better treatment, to provide effective and compassionate clinical care that improves the lives of cancer patients and families, and to educate communities about effective choices to prevent cancer.

DCC provides access to research-based care, advanced technologies, and clinical trials for patients.

Cancer care 

Cancer specialists at Dartmouth Cancer Center (DCC) treat patients with all types of cancer, using technologies in diagnostics and imaging; medical, radiation, and surgical oncology; bone marrow transplantation; and immunotherapy.

DCC has 25 separate programs for treating different cancers. These include:

Blood & Marrow Transplantation Program
Breast Cancer Program
Endocrine Tumors Program
Esophageal Cancer Program
Familial Cancer Program
Gastrointestinal & Pancreatic Cancer Program
Gynecologic Cancer Program
Head & Neck Cancer Program
Hematology / Oncology Program
Hemophilia and Thrombosis Center
Leukemia Program
Liver Tumor Clinic
Lung / Esophageal / Thoracic Cancer Program
Lymphoma Program
Melanoma / Skin Cancer Program
Neuro-Oncology Program
Pancreatic Cancer Program
Pediatric Cancer Program
Prostate & Genitourinary Cancer Programs
Radiation Oncology Program
Rehabilitation Medicine
Skin Cancer Program
Surgical Oncology Program
Thoracic Cancer Program
Thrombosis Program

DCC has in-treatment and patient follow-up programs, including:

Palliative Care 
Patient & Family Support Services
Shared Decision Making
Survivorship

Research 

Member investigators at Dartmouth Cancer Center advance cancer science in six program areas:

Cancer Control
Cancer Mechanisms
Epidemiology and Chemoprevention
Imaging and Radiobiology
Immunology and Immunotherapy
Molecular Therapeutics

Research projects, with funding of more than $68 million per year, are ongoing at the center.

Research collaborations draw on faculty at Dartmouth College and its professional schools: the Geisel School of Medicine, Thayer School of Engineering, and Tuck School of Business. The center's researchers also collaborate with partner-researchers at the University of Massachusetts-Amherst and the University of Vermont. In partnership with The Dartmouth Institute for Health Policy and Clinical Practice, DCC is developing cancer registries in breast and colon cancer, and is shaping new work in health services, outcomes, and comparative effectiveness research.

Physicians and scientists at DCC collaborate to speed the translation of research advances into novel treatments for cancer patients through interdisciplinary clinical programs.

Community outreach 

Research on behavioral risk factors such as smoking, obesity, sun exposure, and environmental risk factors such as arsenic, is translated at DCC into community education and prevention programs targeted to the region’s underserved, rural populations. DCC's "Kick Cancer" and "SunSafe" programs deliver cancer-prevention education to youth populations as well as adults throughout New Hampshire and Vermont.

DCC has developed several approaches to delivering advanced cancer care and technologies to patients throughout its rural region, including web and computer-based surveys to enable patients to provide important medical and psychosocial input to their care team, and interdisciplinary clinics to coordinate visits to several providers in a single day, allowing patients to meet with the specialists who together will design their personalized treatment plan.

Support 

DCC is supported, in part, by the Friends of Norris Cotton Cancer Center, a Section 501(c)(3) tax-exempt corporation. The Friends sponsor and partner with several fundraising events annually, culminating in the annual Prouty and Prouty Ultimate, a series of events in which runners, walkers, cyclists, and rowers contribute to the Friends through distance sponsorships. In 2010, the Prouty events raised more than $2.3 million for DCC and involved more than 4,500 participants and 1,000 volunteers; a record number of participating sponsors, more than 23,000, contributed financial support. The Prouty is the largest charity fundraising event in northern New England. Since the Prouty’s founding in 1982, the events have raised more than $12 million.

Total annual philanthropic support for DCC exceeds $10 million.

References

External links 

Dartmouth College
Dartmouth Medical School
National Cancer Institute

Dartmouth College facilities
Cancer organizations based in the United States
Medical research institutes in the United States
NCI-designated cancer centers